William Lodge (July 4, 1649 – 1689) was an English engraver and printmaker of the Baroque period.

Life
He was born in Yorkshire, where his father was a merchant, and he inherited a degree of financial independence. Lodge was educated first at Leeds, then at Jesus College in Cambridge, then studied law at Lincoln's Inn. He however mostly appears to have been employed in drawing and engraving. He was a friend of the fellow engraver, Francis Place, and enjoyed an informal salon of intellectuals at York. These included Dr. Martin Lister, Ralph Thoresby, and Henry Gyles the glass painter.

Works
Lodge is known best for his engravings. When he accompanied Thomas Belasyse, Earl of Fanconbery, on his embassy to Venice, he became acquainted with a picture book, Viaggio Pittoresco, by Giacomo Barri). The chapters were introduced by a vedute of a city or town of Italy, and followed by a series of engravings of famous paintings in that locus. Lodge had the book republished, copying images. It was entitled The Painter's Voyage of Italy, in which all the famous paintings of the most eminent Masters are particularised, as they are preserved in the several cities of Italy.

He also engraved scientific papers for Martin Lister. He is known to have engraved a portrait of  Oliver Cromwell. He was an avid draughtsman of landscapes throughout England, Wales, and Ireland.

References

{{cite book | first= Stefano| last= Ticozzi| year=1830| title= ''Dizionario degli architetti, scultori, pittori, intagliatori in rame ed in pietra, coniatori di medaglie, musaicisti, niellatori, intarsiatori d'ogni etá e d'ogni nazione (Volume 1)| pages= 334 | publisher=Gaetano Schiepatti |location=Milan | url= https://books.google.com/books?id=0ownAAAAMAAJ&q=Stefano+Ticozzi+Dizionario&pg=PA5 }}The Yorkshire Archaeological Journal; Yorkshire Archaeological Society (1898); page 433. (Googlebooks digitized Oct 27, 2005).A Provincial Man of Science at Work: Martin Lister, F.R.S., and His Illustrators 1670-1683 ''', Robert W. Unwin. Notes and Records of the Royal Society of London (1995) Volume 49(2): pages 209–230.

English printmakers
Baroque printmakers
English engravers
1649 births
1689 deaths
Alumni of Jesus College, Cambridge